Dongfeng Yangtse (扬子江汽车集团有限公司), formerly Yangzijiang Dongfeng Automobile (Wuhan) Co., Ltd. (东风扬子江汽车(武汉)有限责任公司), is a bus manufacturing company based in Wuhan, Hubei, China, founded in 2004.

History
Its roots trace back to 1929 when the Wuhan Bus Management office and repair shop was first set up.  By 1964, the company became the Wuhan Public Bus Factory, manufacturing buses.  In 1999, an agreement as signed with the Mercedes-Benz division in Thailand to develop new models of buses.

In 2004, the company was reorganized and named the Yangzijiang Dongfeng Automobile (Wuhan) Co., Ltd., commonly known as Dongfeng Yangtse Bus.

Buses are built under the Yangtse and Yangzijiang brands.

Dongfeng Yangtse era
In 2016-05-23, Yangzijiang Dongfeng Automobile (Wuhan) Co., Ltd. announced renaming the company to Dongfeng Yangtse (扬子江汽车集团有限公司).

In September 2016, the experimental production line of China Yangzijiang Automobile Group rolled off the production line for the first time. A normal temperature and normal pressure hydrogen energy storage bus, Taige, has almost reached commercial operation capacity.  Its technological breakthrough lies in the use of a chemical absorbent to convert liquid hydrogen It absorbs and mixes it, and then uses a catalyst to reduce and release it, which solves the problem of storage and transportation of hydrogen energy that is dangerous or costly. The traditional hydrogen dilemma is that it must be stored at low temperature or high pressure. Low temperature requires a lot of electricity. It is completely uneconomical. Although it is cheap, it is also a high-priced product, and it has major safety hazards when it is popularized in the market for civilian use. The breakthrough technology lies in Professor Cheng Hansong, an expert of the Thousand Talents Program, who is the world's leading and original disruptive "normal temperature and normal pressure hydrogen storage technology", which can make use of the existing infrastructure such as gas stations and oil transportation systems, greatly reducing the hydrogen economy problems.

In 2020-05-13, Wuhan city East West Lake district people's court accepted Dongfeng Yangtse bankruptcy filed by Changzhou Changjiang Glass Co., Ltd. When the company's debt report period ended in 2020-09-04, 274 creditors had applied total debt claim of 2,367,393,840.72 RMB.

Models
WG6100NHA
WG6100NH0E
WG6101NQE
WG6110CHM4
WG6110NQC
WG6110NQE
WG6111NQC
WG6111NQE
WG6120BEVHM
WG6120CHA
WG6120NHAE
WG6120NHM4
WG6120PHEVAA
WG6121NQOE
WG6810NQP
WG6850NHK
WG6940NQD

Trolley Buses
WG6120BHEVM

WG6124BHEVM

WG6120DHA

WG-D68U

References

External links
Dongfeng Yangtse Bus website

Bus manufacturers of China
Chinese companies established in 2004
Vehicle manufacturing companies established in 2004
Manufacturing companies based in Wuhan
Chinese brands